MD2 or MD-2 may refer to: 

 MD2 (file format)
 MD2 (hash function)
 MD-2 (immunology)

See also
 MD2 low-profile PCI card
 IMBEL MD2 Rifle
 Maryland's 2nd congressional district
 Maryland Route 2